Mosaic: A Celebration of Blue Note Records is the 2009 debut album by The Blue Note 7.

Overview
The Blue Note 7 was formed in 2008 in honor of the 70th anniversary of Blue Note Records.  The group consists of  Peter Bernstein (guitar), Bill Charlap (piano), Ravi Coltrane (tenor saxophone), Lewis Nash (drums), Nicholas Payton (trumpet), Peter Washington (bass), and Steve Wilson (alto saxophone, flute).

The group recorded Mosaic in 2008, which was released in 2009 on Blue Note Records/EMI, and they toured the United States in promotion of the album from January until April 2009.  On this album the group plays the music of Blue Note Records, with arrangements by members of the band and Renee Rosnes.

Track listing

"Mosaic" (by Cedar Walton, arranged by Lewis Nash) – 8:31
"Inner Urge" (by Joe Henderson, arranged by Nicholas Payton) – 7:36
"Search For Peace" (by McCoy Tyner, arranged by Renee Rosnes) – 7:59
"Little B's Poem" (by Bobby Hutcherson, arranged by Steve Wilson) – 6:27
"Criss Cross" (by Thelonious Monk, arranged by Steve Wilson) – 6:55
"Dolphin Dance" (by Herbie Hancock, arranged by Renee Rosnes) – 7:07
"Idle Moments" (by Duke Pearson, arranged by Peter Bernstein) – 6:36
"The Outlaw" (by Horace Silver, arranged by Bill Charlap) – 6:30

Personnel

 Musical

 Peter Bernstein – guitar
 Bill Charlap – piano
 Ravi Coltrane – tenor saxophone
 Lewis Nash – drums
 Nicholas Payton – trumpet
 Peter Washington – bass
 Steve Wilson – alto saxophone, flute

 Technical

 Bill Charlap, Michael Cuscuna and Eli Wolf – producers
 Danny Melnick – executive producer, management
 Dae Bennett – engineer
 Travis Stefl – assistant engineer
 Kurt Lundvall – mastering
 Eli Wolf – A&R
 Keith Karwelies – A&R administration
 Perry Greenfield – product management
 Gordon Jee – creative direction
 Burton Yount and Rachel Salomon – art direction and design
 Jimmy Katz – photography
 Jack Randall – booking
 Renee Rosnes – arranger
 Ira Gitler – liner notes

External links and sources
 The Blue Note 7 official website
 [ allmusic entry]

2009 debut albums
Blue Note Records albums
Post-bop albums
EMI Records albums
Albums produced by Michael Cuscuna
Ravi Coltrane albums